Kholapota  is a village and a gram panchayat in Basirhat II CD Block in  Basirhat subdivision of North 24 Parganas district, West Bengal in India. It belongs to the Presidency division.

Geography
It is located 35 kilometres east from district headquarters Barasat. 60 kilometres (37 mi) from the state capital Kolkata. Kholapota is surrounded by Baduria Block on the north, Basirhat I Block on the east, Haroa Block on the south and Deganga Block on the west. Taki, Barasat, Basirhat, and Hasnabad are nearby cities of Kholapota. The nearest Railway station is Champapukur railway station.

Demographics
In the 2011 Census of India Kholapota has not been identified as a separate place. The population is obviously included in that of some other place, but it is not indicated in the census records.

Economy

Banks
There are branches of the State Bank of India, Bank of India and UCO Bank, at Kholapota.

Transport
SH 2 and SH 3 meet at Kholapota, follow a common route for a short distance and then separate out.

Education
Kholapota P.K Haldar girls high school and Kholapota Sri Abrabindo Tapoban Pathmandir are the two schools of the village.

References

Villages in North 24 Parganas district